The 1988 IIHF Asian Oceanic Junior U18 Championship was the fifth edition of the IIHF Asian Oceanic Junior U18 Championship. It took place between 6 and 13 February 1988 in Bendigo, Australia. The tournament was won by China, who claimed their first title by finishing first in the standings. Japan and South Korea finished second and third respectively.

Standings

Fixtures
Reference

References

External links
International Ice Hockey Federation

IIHF Asian Oceanic U18 Championships
Asian
International ice hockey competitions hosted by Australia